Alfred the Great was an Anglo-Saxon king (871 – 899) of Wessex, an Anglo-Saxon kingdom that existed from 519 to 927 south of the river Thames in England. In the late 9th century, the Vikings had overrun most of the Anglo-Saxon kingdoms that constituted England at the time. Alfred's reign has become regarded as pivotal in the eventual unification of England, after he famously defended Wessex and southern England against the Viking invasions, winning a decisive victory at the Battle of Edington in 878.

The majority of what we know about the historical Alfred comes his biography Life of King Alfred written, during Alfred reign by his direction, in 893 by a Welsh monk Asser. It was not until the English Reformation in the sixteenth century, that Alfred was first given the epithet "the Great"  when he was seen as the ideal Christian sovereign. Over 600 years after his life, that Alfred began to inspire many artistic and cultural works from the sixteenth century onwards, with a height in the Victorian Period, when the cult of Alfred developed into a significant cultural force in literature, the visual arts, and national consciousness. The lists and images on this page cover depictions or references to Alfred in a wide range of media, including works of art, literature, histories and plays all usually favourably or heroically; and educational establishments named in his honour. Also listed are more recent representations of Alfred in popular culture including - film, television, modern historical fiction and video games.

Background to Alfred's growing reputation
Alfred was the youngest son of King Æthelwulf of Wessex. His father died when he was young and three of Alfred's brothers ruled and died in battle before he ascended to the throne in 871. Alfred spent his first seven years of his reign battling the Viking forces, until with Wessex (the last of the Anglo-Saxon kingdoms) half overrun he decisively defeated the Great Heathen Army at the Battle of Edington in 878AD; subsequently the Vikings settled towards the east side of England. Following this, it is recorded that Alfred reorganised national military service, improved Wessex's defence by building a ring of 33 'burhs' (fortified settlements) and designed and built a small fleet of longships, to protect against further Viking threats. From this base, his daughterÆthelflæd and son Edward the Elder began the conquest of the rest of England from Viking control. As Alfred's reign was pivotal it has often been regarded as the first in the lists of English monarchs.

Alfred gathered advisers from across England, Wales and Francia to his court, including a Welsh monk and scholar named Asser. Alfred's positive image was perhaps overemphasised by Asser who Alfred commissioned to write his biography The Life of King Alfred, the first for an English ruler. (The manuscript survives in only one copy, which was part of the Cotton library). Asser portrays his king 'as the embodiment of the ideal, but practical, Christian ruler'. Alfred's reign is notable for a rebirth of learning: several works were translated from Latin into Old English, with some credited to Alfred himself, works that were considered "most necessary for all men to know"; he made education reforms (including advocacy of education in the English language rather than in Latin) and he established schools to provide education for future priests and secular administrators, so that they might be better in their legal judgements. Alfred issued a new law code and commissioned the Anglo-Saxon Chronicle, a collection of annals in Old English that recorded the historical events in England up until 1154.

Asser presents Alfred as saintly, however Alfred was never canonised (in 1441 Henry VI of England attempted unsuccessfully to have him canonized by Pope Eugene IV), so in later catholic medieval England artists turned to the royal Anglo-Saxon saints such as Saint Edmund the Martyr and Saint Edward the Confessor, for inspiration as subjects. (Though venerated at times in the Catholic Church, the current "Roman Martyrology" does not mention Alfred.) While he was not venerated in art, the medieval historians William of Malmesbury, Matthew Paris and Geoffrey of Monmouth further reinforced Alfred's favourable image as a pious Christian ruler.

In the Sixteenth century Alfred became the ideal symbolic champion for the rising English Protestant church during the English Reformation. Alfred encouraged the use of English rather than Latin in education, and his translations were viewed as untainted by the later Roman Catholic influences. Archbishop Matthew Parker published an edition of Asser's Life of Alfred in 1574. It was at this time, over 600 years after his death, Alfred was first given the epithet "the Great". The designation was maintained by those who admired Alfred's perceived patriotism, his undoubted success against barbarism, promotion of education, and establishment of the rule of law. The comparatively greater amount of written information from his reign, including his law code and Asser's account of Alfred's thoughts on law, education and administration helped. The historical Alfred evolved into the increasingly popular legendary Alfred. The Anglican Communion venerated him as a Christian hero, with a feast day or commemoration on 26 October, and he is often found depicted in stained glass in Church of England parish churches. He became the ideal unthreatening example of a ruler when discussing the ideal monarch and the roles of monarchy in a modern state; at the same time Eighteenth-century British royals like Frederick, Prince of Wales were able to draw upon Alfred's popularity in creating their own royal images. The cult of King Alfred the Great increased until by the reign of Victoria, Alfred was perceived as founder of the English nation and an archetypal symbol of the nation's perception of itself. He has been seen as a heroic figure, who centuries after his death inspired many artistic and cultural works. During this period, the name ‘Alfred’ became a popular Christian name, with Queen Victoria in 1844 naming her second son Prince Alfred. In 1870, Edward Augustus Freeman called Alfred the Great ‘the most perfect character in history'. 'Alfredophilia' and 'Alfredomania' found expression in religious, legal, political and historical writing; in poetry, drama, music and prose; and in sculpture, painting, engraving and book-illustration.   History has been kind to Alfred, he was not titled Great in his own historical period, but in 2002 he was still ranked number 14 in the BBC's poll of the 100 Greatest Britons.

Art and sculpture
There are no surviving images of Alfred from his reign, except on his coins. 

Artistic images of King Alfred began to flourish mainly from 18th to the early 20th century. In 1734–1735 Alfred's bust was included as one of the Whig historical champions in ‘The Temple of British Worthies’, in the English landscape gardens of Stowe House created by William Kent. Representations of Alfred proliferated, with Alfred often depicted as the archetypical symbol of the English nation: as a heroic military commander, a wise scholar and upholder of justice. Those who could not own sculpture or high art could possess a decorative image of 'England's Darling' in the fashionable genre of History painting, amongst which the most common examples were Alfred disguised in the Danish camp and Alfred burning the peasant woman's cakes.

Historical writing
Alfred is the subject of several historical works. Early examples include:

Literature
Alfred is the subject of several works of historical fiction. These include:

Theatre, operas and other vocal works
Alfred is the subject of several works of historical drama. These include:

{|  class="wikitable sortable"
!  width="10%" | Date
!  width="16%" | Title
!  width="20%" | Composer/Writer
!  width="16%" | Genre
!  width="38%" | Notes
|- valign="top"
| (1740—1753) 
|* Alfred
| music by Thomas Arne and a libretto by David Mallet and James Thomson.
|a masque/Opera
|  This work was first performed on 1 August 1740, at Cliveden, country home of Frederick, Prince of Wales, as a celebration of the anniversary of his grandfather's, King George I's royal accession to the throne of Great Britain. From it the patriotic anthem "Rule, Britannia!" originates. During the French Wars (1793-1815), patriotic plays, opera and ballets about Alfred became popular often concluding with a rousing rendition of the Thompson's and Arne's ‘Rule Britannia’, as the new anthem became a favoured way to express allegiance to the sovereign.
|- valign="top"
| (1827)
| *Alfred the Great; or, the Enchanted Standard
| Issac Pocock
| light operatic comedy
| A musical drama, in two acts
|- valign="top"
| (1829)
| *Alfred the Great| Sarah Hamilton
|a drama; in five acts|
|- valign="top"
| (1837)
| *Alfred the Great; or The Patriot King| James Sheridan Knowles
| Drama
|
|}

Depictions on screen
Depictions on film and television screen include:

 Video games 
Alfred is the faction leader for Wessex in the 2018 strategy game Total War Saga: Thrones of Britannia.

In the 2020 action role-playing game Assassin's Creed Valhalla, Alfred is leading the Kingdom of Wessex against the Vikings and acts as the main overarching antagonist. At the end of the story, Alfred is revealed to be the Grand Master of the Order of the Ancients, the secretive organization driving the game's events from behind the scenes, as well as the mysterious character known as the "Poor Fellow-Soldier of Christ", who helped the protagonist, Eivor, eliminate the Order by sending her anonymous letters with the whereabouts of certain Order members. When Eivor confronts Alfred, he reveals that he inherited the title of Grand Master along with the crown from his older brother Æthelred, but disagreed with the Order's beliefs, especially their heresy against Christianity, and so sought to purge it so that a new "universal order" may take its place. Alfred's actions would eventually give rise to the Templar Order over two centuries later, which is a continuation of the Order of the Ancients that more closely follows Alfred's beliefs.

Alfred appears in the second and third instalments of the Crusader Kings'' series of grand strategy games by Paradox Interactive. In both titles, he begins as an ealdorman under his brother Æthelred and has not yet become King of Wessex.

Education
A number of educational establishments are named in Alfred's honour:
The University of Winchester created from the former King Alfred's College, Winchester (1928 to 2004)
Alfred University and Alfred State College in Alfred, New York; the local telephone exchange for Alfred University is 871 in commemoration of Alfred's ascension to the throne.
The University of Liverpool created a King Alfred Chair of English Literature
King Alfred's Academy, a secondary school in Wantage, Oxfordshire, the birthplace of Alfred
King's Lodge School in Chippenham, Wiltshire, so named because King Alfred's hunting lodge is reputed to have stood on or near the site of the school
The King Alfred School and Specialist Sports Academy, Burnham Road, Highbridge, so named due to its rough proximity to Brent Knoll (a Beacon site) and Athelney
The King Alfred School in Barnet, North London, UK
King Alfred's house in Bishop Stopford's School at Enfield

Military
The Royal Navy has named one ship and two shore establishments HMS King Alfred, and one of the first ships of the US Navy was named USS Alfred in his honour.

Citations

References
 

 
Alfred
Alfred the Great